Mina 2 is an album by Italian singer Mina, issued in 1966. BMG reissued the album on CD in 1997.

Track listing

Side A

Side B

1966 albums
Italian-language albums
Mina (Italian singer) albums